Anjaiah Yadav Yelganamoni is a Member of the Telangana Legislative Assembly representing Shadnagar constituency. He belongs to the Telangana Rashtra Samithi party.

References

1981 births
Living people
Telangana MLAs 2014–2018
Telangana politicians
Telangana Rashtra Samithi politicians
Telangana MLAs 2018–2023